Davron Khashimov (Uzbek Cyrillic: Даврон Хошимов; born 24 November 1992 in Tashkent) is an Uzbekistani footballer who plays for PFC Lokomotiv Tashkent and Uzbekistan national team. He played in the 2015 AFC Asian Cup qualification.

Career
He plays since 2010 for Pakhtakor Tashkent. Khashimov played his debut match for the national team on 15 November 2013 in the away 2015 Asian Cup qualifying match against Vietnam ended with a 3:0 victory for the Uzbek side. He capped 2 matches for the national team (as of 29 May 2014).

In January 2019 it was announced that he signed for PFC Lokomotiv Tashkent

Honors

Club
Pakhtakor
 Uzbek League (1): 2012
 Uzbek Cup (1): 2011

References 

1992 births
Living people
Sportspeople from Tashkent
Uzbekistani footballers
Uzbekistan international footballers
Pakhtakor Tashkent FK players
Navbahor Namangan players
PFC Lokomotiv Tashkent players
Uzbekistan Super League players
Association football defenders
Footballers at the 2014 Asian Games
2019 AFC Asian Cup players
Asian Games competitors for Uzbekistan